Parectopa is a genus of moths in the family Gracillariidae.

Species
Parectopa bosquella (Chambers, 1876)
Parectopa bumeliella Braun, 1939
Parectopa capnias Meyrick, 1908
Parectopa clethrata Lower, 1923
Parectopa dactylota Meyrick, 1915
Parectopa exorycha Meyrick, 1928
Parectopa geraniella Braun, 1935
Parectopa grisella (van Deventer, 1904)
Parectopa heptametra Meyrick, 1915
Parectopa interpositella (Frey & Boll, 1876)
Parectopa lespedezaefoliella Clemens, 1860
Parectopa leucocyma (Meyrick, 1889)
Parectopa leucographa Turner, 1940
Parectopa lithocolletina (Zeller, 1877)
Parectopa lithomacha Meyrick, 1915
Parectopa lyginella (Meyrick, 1880)
Parectopa mnesicala (Meyrick, 1880)
Parectopa nesitis (Walsingham, 1897)
Parectopa ononidis (Zeller, 1839)
Parectopa ophidias (Meyrick, 1907)
Parectopa oxysphena Meyrick, 1934
Parectopa pennsylvaniella (Engel, 1907)
Parectopa picroglossa Meyrick, 1912
Parectopa plantaginisella (Chambers, 1872)
Parectopa promylaea (Meyrick, 1817)
Parectopa pselaphotis Meyrick, 1915
Parectopa pulverella (Walsingham, 1897)
Parectopa quadristrigella (Zeller, 1877)
Parectopa refulgens Meyrick, 1915
Parectopa robiniella Clemens, 1863
Parectopa rotigera Meyrick, 1931
Parectopa thermopsella (Chambers, 1875)
Parectopa toxomacha (Meyrick, 1883)
Parectopa trichophysa Meyrick, 1915
Parectopa tyriancha Meyrick, 1920
Parectopa undosa (Walsingham, 1897)
Parectopa viminea Meyrick, 1915

Former species
Parectopa albicostella Braun, 1925
Parectopa occulta Braun, 1922

External links
Global Taxonomic Database of Gracillariidae (Lepidoptera)

Gracillariinae
Gracillarioidea genera